The Men's 200m Individual Medley SM10 event at the 2012 Paralympic Games took place on 30 August 2012 at the London Aquatics Centre.

Heats

Heat 1

Heat 2

Final

References
Official Results  

Swimming at the 2012 Summer Paralympics